Thunbergianthus is a genus of flowering plants belonging to the family Orobanchaceae.

Its native range is Africa.

Species:

Thunbergianthus quintasii 
Thunbergianthus ruwenzoriensis

References

Orobanchaceae
Orobanchaceae genera